The 2019 European Athletics Team Championships (ETC) in athletics were held in four cities from 9–11 August 2019.

Grouping and host cities

 Grouping

Exceptionally, for this 2019 edition, the following relegation and promotion principles were used:
 The lowest 5 classified teams in the Super League shall be relegated to the First League. The first classified team of the First League shall be promoted to the Super League. 
 Consequently, 5 lowest classified teams of the First League shall be relegated to the Second League, while the first classified team of the Second League shall be promoted to the First League. Consequently, 5 lowest classified teams of the Second League shall be relegated to the Third League, while the first classified team of the Third League shall be promoted to the Second League.
 The promotion/relegation system for 2019 edition is aimed at enabling the new system of distribution of teams among leagues (approved by European Athletics Council in April 2018) to come into force from 2021 edition. The new system is aimed to have 8 teams in the Super League (plus 1 if the host country not qualified), 12 teams in the First and Second Leagues, with the remaining teams in the Third League starting from 2021 edition of ETC.

Super League

Participating countries

 
  (promoted)
 
 
 
 
  Italy
 
 
  (promoted)
  (promoted)

Men's events

Women's events

Mixed events
(Non scoring)

Score table

Final standings

It is the first win ever for Poland.

First League

Participating countries
One promotion in Super-League, 5 relegations to Second League (4 without not-entered Russia):

  (relegated)
 
  (promoted)
 
  (promoted)
  (relegated)
 
 
 
  (not entered)
  (promoted)

Men's events

Women's events

Score table

Final standings

NOTES: 
 As Russia were unable to take part due to their continuing suspension by the IAAF for systematic doping violations, the Russian team was automatically disqualified, and thus relegated. 
 As the city of Minsk, Belarus, has initially been chosen to host the 2021 Super League by European Athletics, their team should have been automatically promoted to that division following this competition.

Second League

Participating countries

 
  (relegated)
 
 
  (relegated)
  (relegated)
  (promoted)
 
 
  (promoted)
  (promoted)

Men's events

Women's events

Score table

Final standings

Third League

Participating countries

  AASSE (& )
 *
 
 
 
 
  (relegated)
 *
 
 
  (relegated)
 
  (relegated)

(*) Did not compete in 2017.

Men's events

Women's events

Score table

Final standings

References

Results book Bydgoszcz 2019.
First League Results Book

European Athletics Team Championships
Team
European
International athletics competitions hosted by Croatia
International athletics competitions hosted by Poland
International athletics competitions hosted by Norway
2019 in North Macedonia sport
2019 in Polish sport
2019 in Norwegian sport
2019 in Croatian sport
Sport in Sandnes
Sport in Bydgoszcz
Sport in Skopje
Sport in Varaždin
European Team Championships
History of Bydgoszcz